Odda Rutebuss AS is a bus company that operates in Odda, Norway. Founded in 1924, it operates 11 buses with 16 employees, transporting 250,000 passengers per year. In 2008 it lost the public service obligation tender for Odda to Tide Buss, after which Odda Rutebuss remains only as a charter operator.

References

External links
 Official site

Bus companies of Vestland
Companies based in Vestland
Transport companies established in 1924
Odda
1924 establishments in Norway